The Lola T87/50 is an open-wheel formula race car chassis, designed, developed and built by British manufacturer Lola, for use in the International Formula 3000 series and the Japanese Formula 3000 series, a feeder series for Formula One, in 1987.

References 

Open wheel racing cars
International Formula 3000
Lola racing cars